South Korean automobile manufacturer Kia maintains 14 manufacturing facilities in eight countries along with research centres in South Korea, the US, Japan, and Germany. Kia has four manufacturing plants in South Korea and additional plants in China, India, Japan, Mexico, Slovakia, the United States and Vietnam.

Design centers

Namyang Design Center
The Namyang Design Center, located in Hwaseong, South Korea, serves as Kia's primary design facility. The facility, which is shared with parent company Hyundai, is located on over 3.3 million square meters of land and serves as the central hub for engineering work encompassing the entire design process, from pre-design studies, prototyping and extensive track testing, full-scale wind tunnel aerodynamic testing. to crash testing. Kia and Hyundai employees from around the world receive training at the Namyang Center.

Kia Design Center America
The Kia Design Center America in Irvine, California, is located on a  corporate campus with a $130 million initial investment, the Irvine, California Kia Design Center was designed by Skidmore, Owings & Merrill and was completed in 2008, featuring 45 workstations and nine offices. The studio can model up to eight vehicles at once and includes a computerized milling machine that can quickly create full-size models. Work and presentation areas include a 2-D presentation room, "a kind of darkroom in virtual reality where up to three full-size digital images can be projected for evaluation and comparison."

The  building features a hallmark  entry canopy and sits aside a  reflecting pool. The parking lot includes an environmentally efficient bioswale system to filter water runoff.
Kia Design Center, Irvine, CA

Kia Design Center Europe

The Kia Design Center Europe was opened in 2007 in Frankfurt, Germany. Kia had previously shared a facility with Hyundai in Rüsselsheim, Germany.  The new headquarters building is located adjacent to Frankfurt's main showground where the city hosts its biennial auto show.

Kia Design Center China
The Hyundai-Kia R&D center in China is located in both Shanghai and Yantai.

Manufacturing facilities

South Korea

Autoland Gwangmyeong
The plant is near the country's capital of Seoul in Gyeonggi province, with ready access to labor, other resources and transportation facilities, as well as the Seoul metropolitan area.

The factory currently manufactures the Kia Carnival/Sedona (and its variant the Hyundai Entourage, 2007–2009), Kia Rio, Kia Stonic, Kia Stinger and Kia K9/Quoris/K900, with an annual output of 340,000 vehicles.

The Sohari Plant manufactured Kia's first internal combustion engine, followed by the manufacture of its first automobile, the Kia Brisa (1974–1982). In 1975, Kia exported its first vehicle, the Brisa pickup, to the Middle Eastern nation of Qatar.

The South Korean government forced Kia to halt car production in 1981, assessing the Korean auto market as too competitive. In 1986, the government allowed the company to resume manufacturing with its agreement to build the Ford Festiva for export.

The Sohari Plant manufactured the Kia Pride and its rebadged variants the Ford Festiva and Mazda 121, as well as the subsequent Kia Avella and its variant, the Ford Aspire.

Kia Sohari Plant
Kia Brisa (1974–1982)

Autoland Hwasung
By July 2001, cumulative production passed 3 million.
Kia Hwasung Plant

Autoland Gwangju

Formerly Asia Motors used this plant until 1999.

Seosan Plant
Located in Seosan, the facility opened in 2004 as a joint venture with Donghee. It manufactures 230,000 units a year and is the producer of the Kia Picanto/Morning and Kia Ray.

China

Yancheng Plant

In December 2007, Kia Motors Corporation opened its manufacturing facility in Yancheng, Jiangsu Province, its second plant in China and its second plant in conjunction as a joint venture.  Dongfeng Yueda Kia (DYK) Motors is a joint venture of Kia and China's Dongfeng Automotive Group first established in 2002.  The new facility is 3.9 million sq.-ft. (367,794 sq.-m) and is located just 2.2 miles (3.5 km) from the joint venture's existing facility. At an initial cost of US$800 million, the fully integrated passenger car production facility will have an annual capacity of 300,000 units, boosting DYK's total annual capacity to 430,000 vehicles.

India

Anantapur Plant (KIN)

Kia created a greenfield facility in the Anantapur district of Andhra Pradesh, opened in 2018. The site occupies  and has facilities for stamping, welding, painting and assembly with annual production capacity of 300,000 vehicles. Its head office is currently in Amaravathi which is the new capital of Andhra Pradesh. It will also be home to supplier companies’ facilities. The plant currently manufactures the Kia Seltos from mid-2019 and Kia Carens for domestic market and exports to emerging markets. The plant also manufactures the Kia Carnival exclusively for domestic market.
Plant location: 
Address: Ammavaripalli Village, Ananthapur, Andhra Pradesh-515164

Mexico

Monterrey Plant (KMMX)

Located in Pesquería, near Monterrey, Nuevo León, and opened in September 2016, this US$1 billion plant is capable of producing 300,000 cars annually. The facility currently manufactures the third generation Forte and the fourth generation Rio. It also manufactures the fifth generation Hyundai Accent for the American continent. The press factory developed and installed a uniform cushioning device with a high quality stabilization effect by ensuring uniform panel quality. The body shop has achieved 100% welding automation rate with more than 300 robots. In the event of a facility failure, a monitoring system has also been established that allows Korean experts to provide remote support. The paint shop applied an eco-friendly water-soluble method that can paint a total of 15 kinds of colors. The outfitting factory applied a one-kit system using a bridge direct supply method for module parts such as seats and bumpers, and a conveyor.

In 2022, Kia announced an additional $480 million to open at least five new production facilities while $67 million of the existing investment will be used to improve commuting conditions.

Pakistan

Lucky Motor
Lucky Motor is a joint venture between Yunus Brothers Group and Kia Motors. It currently manufactures the Kia Picanto, Kia Sportage, Kia Sorento, Kia Grand Carnival, Kia Stonic and Kia Frontier.

Slovakia

Žilina Plant (KaSK)

In April 2007, Kia opened its first plant in Europe, at the initial cost of €1b, in Žilina, Slovakia, about 200 kilometres north-east of Bratislava, with initial production concentrating around the Kia Cee'd model, designed exclusively for the European market, with production later expanding to the Kia Venga and Kia Sportage. The capacity of the plant is 300,000 units per year. It is one of the few auto factories in the world that is capable of building up to eight different models on the same line, and build ratios can be adjusted to demand. In 2019, Kia's Zilina plant built a system to replace all electricity with renewable energy. In 2020, Kia invested 70 million euros to expand the engine production line at Kia's Zilina plant and dispatched 184 technicians on chartered flights. After the expansion of the engine production line, the company will produce 1.6 GDI engines and 1.6 T-GDI engines. The Kia Zilina plant plans to produce small and mid-sized electric vehicles specialized for the European market from 2025. 
Kia Žilina Plant Official Site
Kia Slovakia Plant

United States

Georgia Plant (KMMG)

Kia Manufacturing Georgia (KMMG), Kia's plant in West Point, Georgia, is capable of producing 360,000 cars annually for the North American and global markets. In addition to four main areas (stamping, welding, paint, and assembly), the facility also includes a transmission shop, module shop, and a two-mile (3 km) test track. The assembly area features more than a half mile of height-adjustable conveyors and wood flooring.

Production began with the second generation Kia Sorento on November 16, 2009. The facility currently manufactures the fourth (2021) generation Sorento, the fifth (2021) generation K5, the first (2020) generation Telluride, and the fifth-generation Sportage.

Kia's Georgia plant recorded cumulative production of 1 million units in 2013 and exceeded 3 million units in September 2019. On December 31, 2021, President Jangsu Shin retired and a new CEO, Stuart Countess, was appointed effective January 2022.

Savannah Plant 
	
On May 20, 2022, Kia's parent company Hyundai announced plans to construct a new electric vehicle plant near Savannah, Georgia.

Uzbekistan

ADM-Jizzakh
The ADM Jizzakh plant began its work at the end of 2020 with a yearly production capacity of 25,000, it currently produces Kia Seltos, Kia K5 and Kia K8.

Vietnam

Chu Lai Plant
Since 2001, Kia manufactured automobiles as part of a joint ventured with Truong Hai Automobile Co. at a factory located in Chu Lai, Quảng Nam Province, Vietnam. The facility expanded in 2003 on 38 ha in Tam Hiep Industrial Park with an investment of VND1,900 billion. In 2007, Truong Hai Automobile Co. Ltd became Truong Hai Automobile Joint Stock Company (Thaco), with automobiles marketed as Thaco-Kia. The joint venture produces the Hyundai Solati and Hyundai County in Chu Lai.
Kia Quang Nam Plant
Kia Truong Hai Official Site

References

External links
Facilities & Buildings at Kia Motors UK's official press site
Kia West Point Georgia Plant
Kia Georgia Plant Video
KMMG Official Website

 
Manufacturing in South Korea
Gyeonggi Province
Lists of motor vehicle assembly plants